Simen is a male given name that is a Norwegian variant of Simon. It is also an Italian surname. Notable people with the name include:

Simen Agdestein (born 1967), Norwegian chess grandmaster and retired footballer
Simen Berntsen (born 1976), retired Norwegian ski jumper
Simen Brekkhus (born 1997), Norwegian footballer
Simen Brenne (born 1981), Norwegian footballer
Simen Hestnæs or ICS Vortex (born 1974), Norwegian musician, vocalist of the avant-garde metal band Arcturus
Simen Kvia-Egeskog (born 2003), Norwegian footballer
Simen Lieungh (born 1960), Norwegian businessperson
Simen Møller (born 1988), Norwegian footballer
Simen Østensen (born 1984), Norwegian cross-country skier
Simen Skappel (1866–1945), Norwegian historian and statistician
Simen Skjønsberg (1920–1993), Norwegian journalist and writer
Simen Wangberg (born 1991), Norwegian footballer
Simen Østby (born 2007), Norwegian footballer

Surname
Enrico "Rico" Simen (born 1962), Swiss curler, 1988 Winter Olympics participant
Rinaldo Simen (1849–1910), Swiss journalist and politician

See also
Simen Mountain National Park or Semien Mountains National Park, one of the National Parks of Ethiopia
Simen Mountains or Semien Mountains (also spelled Simien and Simen) lie in northern Ethiopia, north east of Gondar
Simen ta or Four Gates Pagoda, Sui Dynasty (581-618 AD) stone Chinese pagoda in central Shandong Province, China
Simon (given name)
Saimin
Semen
Shimen (disambiguation)
Simeon (disambiguation)